"Bloody Valentine" (stylized in all lowercase) is a song by American musician Machine Gun Kelly, released on May 1, 2020 by Interscope Records. The song is the first single from his fifth studio album Tickets to My Downfall.

Background
The song was written by Machine Gun Kelly with Nicholas Alex Long, Mod Sun, and Travis Barker, with the latter also serving as drummer and producer on the track. The video stars Megan Fox as Machine Gun Kelly's lover. The video was shot in a rented house located in the Los Angeles area. It won the award for "Best Alternative" at the 2020 MTV Video Music Awards. The two also star together in the film Midnight in the Switchgrass.

An acoustic version of the song was released on June 16, 2020, alongside a video directed by Sam Cahill. The song is featured in Tony Hawk's Pro Skater 1 + 2.

Composition
"Bloody Valentine" is a pop-punk ballad with synth-pop influences. The song's "iconic intro and verse riff" have been noted as being one of the most memorable moments on the Tickets To My Downfall album. NME compared it to Blink-182's Greatest Hits crammed into one song.

Accolades

Live performances
On May 12, 2020 in promotion of the track Kelly and Barker did an at home performance of "Bloody Valentine" on The Late Late Show with James Corden, the video has over 3.4 million views on Youtube. On August 30, 2020, Machine Gun Kelly and Travis Barker performed "Bloody Valentine" live at the 2020 MTV Video Music Awards. On November 23, 2020 Machine Gun Kelly performed the song live at the 2020 American Music Awards. Kelly in 2021 performed the track on Jimmy Kimmel Live in a medley including "Bloody Valentine" as well as other Tickets to My Downfall tracks such as "Drunk Face" and "All I Know".

Personnel
Credits adapted from Tidal.
 Machine Gun Kelly – vocals and guitar
 Derek Smith – composing, songwriting
 Scott Skyrzinski – mixing assistance
 Nicholas Alex Long – guitar, bass
 Travis Barker – producer, drums
 Colin Leonard – master engineering
 Neal Avron – mixing

Charts

Weekly charts

Year-end charts

Certifications

Release history

References

2020 songs
2020 singles
2020s ballads
Machine Gun Kelly (musician) songs
American pop punk songs
Pop ballads
Rock ballads
Song recordings produced by Travis Barker
Songs written by Machine Gun Kelly (musician)
Songs written by Travis Barker